The Damani is a thin-tail, meat and wool breed of sheep which is found in the Dera Ismail Khan district and part of Bannu district in Khyber Pakhtunkhwa province of Pakistan.

Characteristics 
They are small to medium with a white body coat with a black or tan head and camel colored legs. They have small ears. The udder and teats are well developed.

On average and at birth, rams weigh  and ewes weigh . Average litter size is one. The number of members of the Damani has decreased from over one million in 1986 to approximately 600,000 in 2006.

References

Sheep breeds originating in Pakistan
Sheep breeds